Pentifylline (marketed as Cosaldon) is a vasodilator.

References 

Phosphodiesterase inhibitors
Vasodilators
Xanthines